Margaret Court defeated Nancy Richey in the final, 6–2, 6–2 to win the women's singles tennis title at the 1969 US Open. It was her third major singles title of the year, her third US Open singles title and her sixteenth singles major overall. Court would go on to win the next five majors, setting the record for most consecutive major titles in the Open Era at six.

Virginia Wade was the defending champion, but lost in the semifinals to Court.

Seeds
The seeded players are listed below. Margaret Court is the champion; others show the round in which they were eliminated.

 Ann Haydon-Jones (withdrew from the tournament before it began)
 Margaret Court (champion)
 Billie Jean King (quarterfinals)
 Julie Heldman (quarterfinals)
 Virginia Wade (semifinals)
 Nancy Richey (finalist)
 Rosie Casals (semifinals)
 Kerry Melville (first round)

Draw

Key
 Q = Qualifier
 WC = Wild card
 LL = Lucky loser
 r = Retired

Final eight

Earlier rounds

Section 1

Section 2

Section 3

Section 4

External links
1969 US Open – Women's draws and results at the International Tennis Federation

US Open (tennis) by year – Women's singles
Women's Singles
US Open - Women's Singles
US Open - Women's Singles